Yael López (born 17 December 1998) is a Costa Rican professional footballer who plays as a right-back for Liga FPD club Liga Deportiva Alajuelense.

Career
Lopez and teammate Jose Alfaro joined Saprissa on loan following Carmelita’s relegation, with the deal being confirmed on 3 June, 2019. He made his debut for Saprissa on 20 July, 2019 against the defending champions A.D. San Carlos. He was part of the team that triumphed in the 2019 CONCACAF League winning the final against F.C. Motagua of Honduras.

International career
He was selected for Costa Rica squad for the 2021 CONCACAF Gold Cup and made his debut on 20 July 2021 in a game against Jamainca.

Honours
Saprissa
 CONCACAF League: 2019
 Liga FPD: Clausura 2020

References

External links

1998 births
Living people
Costa Rican footballers
Costa Rica international footballers
Association football defenders
Deportivo Saprissa players
C.S. Herediano footballers
Liga FPD players
2021 CONCACAF Gold Cup players